Vice President for Economic Affairs is a government position in Iran whose officeholder acts as a Vice President of Iran. Mohsen Rezaee currently serves in the position, being appointed on 25 August 2021.

As existence of this office is not obligatory by law, the responsibilities and authorities vested in this position could vary and many presidents did not appoint anyone in the capacity.

List of officeholders

References 

Vice presidents of Iran